Charles-Antoine Rochat (1 June 1892 – 31 March 1975) was a French diplomat.

Early life
Charles-Antoine Rochat was born on 1 June 1892 in Chambéry, France.

Career
He served as the Secretary General of the Ministry of Foreign Affairs and International Development from 3 January 1942 to August 1944.

Death
He died on 31 March 1975 in Annecy, France.

References

1892 births
1975 deaths
French diplomats
People of Vichy France